Tibilov is an Ossetian masculine surname, its feminine counterpart is Tibilova. It may refer to;

List
Georgii Tibilov (born 1984), Ukrainian freestyle wrestler
Leonid Tibilov (born 1952), South Ossetian politician

Ossetian-language surnames